Federico "Fede" Darío José Vega (born 4 February 1993) is an Argentine footballer who plays as a right back. He is currently a free agent after most recently playing for Union SG.

Club career
Born in Don Torcuato, Buenos Aires Province, Vega joined River Plate's youth setup in 2004. In January 2013 he was called up to the main squad by manager Ramón Díaz for the pre-season, being subsequently promoted to the first team.

On 13 October 2013 Vega made his professional – and Primera División – debut, starting in a 0–1 away loss against Newell's Old Boys. After appearing in a 1–2 home loss against Estudiantes, he was demoted to the reserves, as Díaz was dismissed.

On 4 February 2015 Vega was released by River. Late in the month, he was linked to a possible move to FC Dallas, but nothing came of it.

In July 2015 Vega joined AD Alcorcón in Spain. Initially assigned to the reserves, he appeared the whole pre-season with the main squad and was granted a first team number on 19 August, being assigned #2 jersey.

Vega made his debut for the Alfareros on 9 September 2015, starting in a 0–1 Copa del Rey home defeat against SD Ponferradina. In late January 2016, he was chosen as first-choice by manager Juan Muñiz, and remained a starter until the end of the campaign.

On 22 June 2016, Vega renewed with Alcorcón for a further campaign. On 11 September he scored his first professional goal, netting the game's only in a home success over Gimnàstic de Tarragona.

On 28 June 2017, Vega left the club as his contract was due to expire, and joined Segunda División B side Real Murcia on 18 July. The following 31 January, he returned to the second tier after agreeing to a deal with Lorca FC.

Honours
River Plate
Argentina Primera Division: 2014 Final
U-20 Copa Libertadores: 2012

Individual
 Proximus League Team of the Season: 2018–19
 Proximus League Team of the Season: 2019–20

References

External links

1994 births
Living people
Sportspeople from Buenos Aires Province
Argentine footballers
Association football defenders
Argentine Primera División players
Club Atlético River Plate footballers
Segunda División players
Segunda División B players
AD Alcorcón footballers
Real Murcia players
Lorca FC players
Royale Union Saint-Gilloise players
Challenger Pro League players
Argentina youth international footballers
Argentine expatriate footballers
Argentine expatriate sportspeople in Belgium
Argentine expatriate sportspeople in Spain
Expatriate footballers in Belgium
Expatriate footballers in Spain